This is the family tree of the Cornelii Scipiones — a prominent family of the Roman Republic — who were allied with the Sempronii Gracchi, Aemilii Paulli, and Caecilii Metelli, whose members are also shown. Only magistracies attested with certainty in Broughton's Magistrates of the Roman Republic have been mentioned. The dotted lines show adoptions from natural fathers. The name "Cornelius" is implied for all the men named Scipio except Quintus Caecilius Metellus Pius Scipio Nasica.

Gallery

References 
 T. Robert S. Broughton, The Magistrates of the Roman Republic, American Philological Association, 1952–1960.
 Christopher John Smith, Kaj Sandberg (editors), Omnium Annalium Monumenta: Historical Writing and Historical Evidence in Republican Rome, Leiden & Boston, Brill, 2017, pp. 434, 435.
 Friedrich Münzer, Realencyclopädie der Classischen Altertumswissenschaft (abbreviated PW), J. B. Metzler, Stuttgart, 1894–1980, vol. 7, pp. 1429, 1430.

Cornelii Scipiones